Brendan Bradley may refer to:

 Brendan Bradley (actor) (born 1983), American actor
 Brendan Bradley (footballer) (born 1950), Irish footballer